Year 1213 (MCCXIII) was a common year starting on Tuesday (link will display the full calendar) of the Julian calendar.

Events 
 May 15 – King John of England submits to Pope Innocent III, who in turn lifts the interdict of 1208 the following year.
 May 30 – Battle of Damme: The English fleet under William Longespée, 3rd Earl of Salisbury, destroys a French fleet off the Belgian port in the first major victory for the fledgling Royal Navy.
 September 12 – Battle of Muret: The Toulousain and Aragonese forces of Raymond VI of Toulouse and Peter II of Aragon are defeated by the Albigensian Crusade, under Simon de Montfort.
 Jin China is overrun by the Mongols under Genghis Khan, who plunder the countryside and cities, until only Beijing remains free, despite two bloody palace coups and a lengthy siege.
 Pope Innocent III issues a charter, calling for the Fifth Crusade to recapture Jerusalem.
 Construction of the Kilkenny Castle in Ireland is completed.

Births 
 March 9 – Hugh IV, Duke of Burgundy, French crusader (d. 1271)
 June 10 –  Fakhr-al-Din Iraqi, Persian philosopher and Sufi mystic
 Ibn al-Nafis, polymath (d. 1288)
 Hethum I, King of Armenia, ruler of the Armenian Kingdom of Cilicia (d. 1270)

Deaths 
 January 18 – Queen Tamar of Georgia (b. c. 1160)
 April 13 – Guy of Thouars, regent of Brittany
 April 21 – Maria of Montpellier, Lady of Montpellier, Queen of Aragon (b. 1182)
 September 12 – King Peter II of Aragon (killed in battle) (b. 1174)
 September 28 – Gertrude of Merania, queen consort regent of Hungary (murdered) (b. 1185)
 October 10 – Frederick II, Duke of Lorraine
 October 14 – Geoffrey Fitz Peter, 1st Earl of Essex
 Sharafeddin Tusi, Persian mathematician (b. 1135)

References